Gabriel Gurméndez Armand-Ugon (born 1961) is a Uruguayan industrial engineer, business executive and politician, serving as president of the National Administration of Telecommunications (ANTEL) since 17 June 2020.

Background

He studied industrial engineering at Universidad de la República, in Montevideo. He served as head of a number of large companies, including the Uruguayan telecommunications company ANTEL.

Gurméndez also served as general manager of Punta del Este International Airport (Laguna del Sauce International Airport), Uruguay.

Former ASUR Director.

Minister of Transport and Public Works

From mid- to late-2004 Gurméndez served as Uruguayan Minister of Transport and Public Works. He thus participated in the government of President Jorge Batlle.

Later career

Subsequently Gurméndez moved to Mexico in late 2004. He served as Chief Executive of Cancún International Airport.

References

External links 

1961 births
Living people
Uruguayan industrial engineers
Colorado Party (Uruguay) politicians
Ministers of Transport and Public Works of Uruguay

University of the Republic (Uruguay) alumni
People educated at The British Schools of Montevideo